Yanajirca or Yana Hirka (Quechua yana black, Ancash Quechua hirka mountain, "black mountain", also spelled Yanajirca) is a mountain in the Andes of Peru, about  high. It is located in the Lima Region, Cajatambo Province, Cajatambo District. Yana Hirka is southwest of Mishi Waqanan and northwest of Pishtaq.

References

Mountains of Peru
Mountains of Lima Region